An Inspector Calls is a 2015 Hong Kong black comedy film directed by Raymond Wong and Herman Yau. Based on the 1945 British play by J. B. Priestley, An Inspector Calls, the film stars Louis Koo as Inspector Goole (renamed "Inspector Karl") (Pronounced Gaa2 賈 in Cantonese, which is a homophone for 假, which means fake, or false), Eric Tsang as Arthur Birling (renamed "Kau Ming"), Teresa Mo as Sybil Birling (renamed "Anson Kau"), Hans Zhang as Gerald Croft (renamed "Johnnie Kei"), Gordon Lam as Eric Birling (renamed "Tim Kau"), Chrissie Chau as Eva Smith (though the character goes by various names), Karena Ng as Sheila Birling  (renamed "Sherry Kau") and Law Lan as Edna (though unnamed in the film). In adapting the play for a Chinese audience, the film incorporates wacky, slapstick elements while retaining the original's criticism of social elites.

Cast
 Louis Koo as Inspector Karl (賈探員)
 Eric Tsang as Kau Ming (裘明), a bankrupt businessman
 Teresa Mo as Anson Kau (裘李安心), chairwoman of the Women's Aid Association
 Hans Zhang as Johnnie Kei (祈世昌), a rich heir and Sherry's fiancé
 Gordon Lam as Tim Kau (裘添富), elder son of the Kau family
 Chrissie Chau as Cindy Cheung (張小娟), a suicide victim who goes by various identities throughout the film in flashbacks, such as Mavis (美芬), Snow (白雪), May Cheung (張美玲) and Jean Wong (王子欣)
 Karena Ng as Sherry Kau (裘蔓莉), younger daughter of the Kau family
 Liu Yan as Yvonne Kwok (郭婉儀), Tim's girlfriend
 Raymond Wong in multiple roles as a factory foreman; clothes shop manager; Siu Sai-kam (邵世金), Johnnie's uncle; barman; Anson's female secretary; a tattooed man.

Guest stars
 Donnie Yen as Pop quadruplet 
 Kelly Chen as Inspector Jane (珍探員)
 Stephy Tang as Yvonne's assistant
 Dada Chan as Sexy
 Annie Liu as worker 
 Cheung Tat-ming as Sexy's boyfriend 
 Michael Tse as Super waiter (超級侍應)
 Wong You-nam as Detective Wong (黃探員), Inspector Jane's assistant
 Alex Lam as Four-Eyed Frog (四眼田雞)
 Felix Lok as brothel client
 Michelle Loo as nightclub manageress
 Law Lan as Kau's housemaid
 Jenny Xu as Jenny (珍妮)
 Jacquelin Chong as clothes shop employee
 Lisa Chong as barman's girlfriend
 Elena Kong as Mrs. Chiu (趙太)
 Tam Ping-man as brothel client
 Kingdom Yuen as Mrs. Leung (梁太)
 Amanda Lee as Snow
 Emily Kwan as Mrs. Cheung (張太)
 Anthony Sandstrom
 Zhang Songwen as brothel client

References

External links
 
 

2015 films
Hong Kong black comedy films
2015 black comedy films
Hong Kong slapstick comedy films
Hong Kong detective films
Films directed by Herman Yau
Hong Kong films based on plays
Films set in Hong Kong
Films shot in Hong Kong
Films based on works by J. B. Priestley
2010s Hong Kong films